Chantal Mouffe (born 17 June 1943) is a Belgian political theorist, formerly teaching at University of Westminster.

She is best known for her contribution to the development—jointly with Ernesto Laclau, with whom she co-authored her most frequently cited publication Hegemony and Socialist Strategy—of the so-called Essex School of discourse analysis, a type of post-Marxist political inquiry drawing on Gramsci, post-structuralism and theories of identity, and redefining Leftist politics in terms of radical democracy. She is also the author of influential works on agonistic political theory, including Agonistics: Thinking the World Politically and The Democratic Paradox. Her most recent book is For a Left Populism, published in 2018.

Education
Chantal Mouffe studied at the Universities of Leuven, Paris and Essex and has worked in many universities throughout the world (in Europe, North America and Latin America). She has also held visiting positions at Harvard, Cornell, Princeton and the CNRS (Paris). During 1989–1995, she served as Programme Director at the Collège international de philosophie in Paris. She currently holds a professorship at the Department of Politics and International Relations, University of Westminster in the United Kingdom, where she is a member of the Centre for the Study of Democracy.

Work
A prominent critic of deliberative democracy (especially in its Rawlsian and Habermasian versions), she is also known for her use of the work of Carl Schmitt, mainly the concept of "the political", in proposing a radicalization of modern democracy—what she calls "agonistic pluralism". She has developed an interest in highlighting the radical potential of artistic practices. Mouffe's Agonistics: Thinking the World Politically (2013) has been criticised by Timothy Laurie for its strong focus on State institutions, noting that Mouffe's "professed enthusiasm for (some) non-Western Islamist movements is solely conditional upon their assumption of State instruments".

Publications

 (ed.) Gramsci and Marxist Theory. London – Boston: Routledge / Kegan Paul, 1979.
 (with Ernesto Laclau) Hegemony and Socialist Strategy: Towards a Radical Democratic Politics. London – New York: Verso, 1985. 
 (ed.) Dimensions of Radical Democracy: Pluralism, Citizenship, Community. London – New York: Verso, 1992.
The Return of the Political. London – New York: Verso, 1993.
Le politique et ses enjeux. Pour une démocratie plurielle. Paris: La Découverte/MAUSS, 1994.
 (ed.) Deconstruction and Pragmatism. London – New York: Routledge, 1996.
 (ed.) The Challenge of Carl Schmitt. London – New York: Verso, 1999.
The Democratic Paradox. London – New York: Verso, 2000.
 (ed.) Feministische Perspektiven. Wien: Turia + Kant, 2001.
 (ed.) The legacy of Wittgenstein: Pragmatism or Deconstruction. Frankfurt am Main – New York: Peter Lang, 2001. 
On the Political. Abingdon – New York: Routledge, 2005.
 Hegemony, Radical Democracy, and the Political, edited by James Martin, London: Routledge, 2013. 
 Agonistics: Thinking The World Politically. London – New York: Verso, 2013.
 Mouffe C, 1995 ‘Post-marxism: democracy and identity’, Environment and Planning D vol.13 pp. 259–266 ML: P305 E30.
 (in conversation with Íñigo Errejón) Podemos: In the Name of the People (trans. Sirio Canos), London: Lawrence & Wishart, 2016.
For a Left Populism. London – New York: Verso, 2018.
Towards a Green Democratic Revolution. London - New York: Verso, 2022.

See also
 List of deconstructionists

References

Further reading
 Anna Marie Smith, Laclau and Mouffe: The Radical Democratic Imaginary, London: Routledge, 1998.
 David Howarth, Discourse, Milton Keynes: Open University Press, 2000.
 Louise Philips and Marianne Jorgensen, Discourse Analysis as Theory and Method, London: Sage, 2002.
 David Howarth, Aletta Norval and Yannis Stavrakakis (eds), Discourse Theory and Political Analysis, Manchester: Manchester University Press, 2002.
 Jacob Torfing, New Theories of Discourse: Laclau, Mouffe, Žižek, Oxford: Blackwell, 1999.
 Society is Always Divided, interview with Digital Development Debates, 2015 March.

Living people
1943 births
Writers from Charleroi
20th-century Belgian women writers
21st-century Belgian women writers
Belgian feminists
Belgian political scientists
Belgian political philosophers
Discourse analysts
Feminist studies scholars
Marxist theorists
Political philosophers
Populism scholars
Catholic University of Leuven (1834–1968) alumni
Academics of the University of Westminster
Carl Schmitt scholars
Women political scientists